Dysgonia renalis is a moth of the family Noctuidae first described by George Hampson in 1894. It is found in India.

References

Dysgonia